Federico Fernández (born 21 February 1989) is an Argentine professional footballer who plays as a centre-back for Al-Duhail.

Fernández began his career at Estudiantes de La Plata, where he reached the final of the Copa Sudamericana and won the Copa Libertadores, before moving to Napoli in 2011. He was used sparingly by the Serie A club, and spent time on loan at Getafe, before joining Swansea City in 2014.

Fernández made his full international debut in 2009 and has since earned over 30 international caps, scoring three goals. He was part of the Argentine squad which reached the 2014 FIFA World Cup Final.

Biography
Federico has Italian origins: his maternal great-grandfather was a native of Lacedonia, in the Province of Avellino. As a result, he has an Italian passport.

Club career

Estudiantes
Fernández made his league debut for Estudiantes de La Plata on 14 September 2008 during the 2008 Apertura tournament in a 1–0 defeat to Vélez Sársfield. He played two games in Estudiantes' run to the final of Copa Sudamericana 2008. 

Fernández scored his first goal with the squad in an away match against Lanús on 2 May 2009, following an assist by teammate Juan Sebastián Verón. Later that year, Estudiantes won the 2009 Copa Libertadores, although Fernández's only contributions were two substitute appearances against Defensor Sporting Club in the quarter-finals.

Napoli
Fernández was signed by Serie A club Napoli in December 2010 for a reported fee of about €2.5 million. Due to his lack of a European Union passport, however, he arrived in Italy only in July 2011.

On 2 November 2011, Fernández scored his first two goals for Napoli, against Bayern Munich in a Champions League group stage away tie. Both headers came after Napoli had conceded three times in the first half, although Napoli lost the match 3–2.

Having only made nine appearances across all competitions for Napoli that season, on 31 January 2013 Fernández was loaned to Spanish La Liga club Getafe for the remainder of the campaign, bolstering the club's defence following the sale of David Abraham to 1899 Hoffenheim.

Fernández played the full 90 minutes of the 2014 Coppa Italia Final, which Napoli won 3–1 against Fiorentina.

Swansea City
On 20 August 2014, it was announced that Fernández had signed for Premier League side Swansea City on a four-year contract for €10 million. Six days later, he made his debut for the club, playing the entirety of a 1–0 win over Rotherham United in the second round of the League Cup. His first Premier League appearance for Swansea was on 13 September, replacing Jordi Amat at half-time in a 4–2 defeat away to Chelsea.

Fernández was given a straight red card for a foul on Philippe Coutinho in added time at the end of Swansea's League Cup fourth-round match against Liverpool at Anfield on 28 October; minutes later, Dejan Lovren scored the winner to knock Swansea out of the tournament. Two days later, however, the FA rescinded the red card on appeal from Swansea, thus avoiding a three-match ban for Fernández. On the opening day of the 2015–16 season, he scored an own goal vs Chelsea, in a match that ended 2–2 at Stamford Bridge. He scored his first goal for Swansea on 19 March 2016 in a 1–0 victory over Aston Villa at the Liberty Stadium.

Newcastle United
On 9 August 2018, Fernández joined Newcastle United on a two-year contract. The move reunited him with Rafael Benítez, his manager when both were at Napoli. He scored his first Premier League goal on 2 November 2019 in a 3–2 away win at West Ham United. His second Newcastle goal came in a 2–1 Premier League home win against Southampton.

On 7 July 2021, Fernández signed a contract extension with Newcastle United.

Elche
On 1 September 2022, Fernández signed a one-year contract with Elche. He left the club in December, after just one match.

Al-Duhail
On 4 February 2023, Fernández joined Qatari side Al-Duhail.

International career
In January 2009, Fernández was selected to join the Argentina under-20 squad for the 2009 South American Youth Championship in Venezuela.

Fernández made his debut for the Argentina senior team against Ecuador in April 2011. He established himself as a regular in defence during Argentina's successful FIFA World Cup qualification campaign under head coach Alejandro Sabella.

In June 2014, Fernández was named in Argentina's squad for the 2014 World Cup. He made his World Cup debut in Argentina's 2–1 win against Bosnia and Herzegovina at the Maracanã Stadium, playing the full match in defence.

Career statistics

Club

International

Scores and results list Argentina's goal tally first, score column indicates score after each Fernández goal.

Honours
Estudiantes
Copa Libertadores: 2009
Argentine Primera División: 2010 Apertura

Napoli
Coppa Italia: 2011–12, 2013–14

Argentina
FIFA World Cup runner-up: 2014

References

External links

 Argentine Primera statistics at Fútbol XXI 
 
 

1989 births
Living people
Argentine sportspeople of Italian descent
People of Campanian descent
Sportspeople from Buenos Aires Province
Argentine footballers
Association football defenders
Estudiantes de La Plata footballers
S.S.C. Napoli players
Getafe CF footballers
Swansea City A.F.C. players
Newcastle United F.C. players
Elche CF players
Argentine Primera División players
Serie A players
La Liga players
Premier League players
English Football League players
Argentina under-20 international footballers
Argentina international footballers
2014 FIFA World Cup players
Argentine expatriate footballers
Argentine expatriate sportspeople in Italy
Argentine expatriate sportspeople in Spain
Argentine expatriate sportspeople in Wales
Argentine expatriate sportspeople in England
Expatriate footballers in Italy
Expatriate footballers in Spain
Expatriate footballers in Wales
Expatriate footballers in England